Mariano Limjap (October 19, 1856 – March 4, 1926) was a Filipino revolutionary who is part of the Katipunan. He was a businessman (one of the best in the country), philanthropist, and nationalist. He was incarcerated by the Spanish for funding the Manila battalion when in fact his only "crime" was patriotism. After the Philippine–American War, he was included in the committee for the creation of a Rizal monument in Luneta as decreed by Act No. 243, approved by the United States Philippine Commission.

References

 "Mariano Limjap (1856-1926)". (2009). National Historical Commission of the Philippines. Historical marker, Binondo, Manila.

External links
 House of Limjap: The 19th Century Founding of a Philippine Chinese Mestizo Family

20th-century Filipino businesspeople
Filipino philanthropists
Filipino Resistance activists
People from San Miguel, Manila
1856 births
1926 deaths
Members of the Malolos Congress
19th-century Filipino businesspeople